is located in Chūō-ku, Sapporo, Hokkaido, Japan. It was built in 1907 for horse racing use. It has 12,000 seats, with a capacity of 30,000.

Sapporo Racecourse hosts one GII (Grade 2) race, the Sapporo Kinen.

Physical attributes

Main turf course

1000m, 1200m, 1500m, 1800m, 2000m, and 2600m races are run on the Main turf course.

Dirt course

1000 m, 1200 m, 1500 m, 1800 m, 2000 m, and 2600 m  races are run on the dirt oval.

Notable races

Access 
 JR Hokkaido: 10 minutes walk from Sōen Station

External links 
 JRA Sapporo Racecourse 
 Hokkaidokeiba 
 Sapporo Racecourse

Chūō-ku, Sapporo
Horse racing venues in Japan
Sports venues in Sapporo
Sports venues completed in 1907
1907 establishments in Japan